Uglješa is a Serbian masculine given name. It may refer to:

Uglješa Kojadinović (1936–1982), actor
Uglješa Mrnjavčević (1346–1371), medieval nobleman
Uglješa Radinović (born 1993), footballer
Uglješa Šajtinac (born 1971), writer
Uglješa Vlatković, medieval nobleman

Slavic masculine given names
Serbian masculine given names